The Boston Bulldogs were a soccer club founded in 1996 as the Worcester Wildfire. The team debuted in the USISL and would play in the A-League from 1997 to 2000. Before folding, the team played its final season in the USL D3 Pro Soccer League in 2001.

The club played its games at Bowditch Field in Framingham, Massachusetts.

History

The first year in the A-League was fraught with financial problems and lack of a regular training facility. The owner was John Curtis from Cape Cod who also owned the Cape Cod Crusaders and the new women's franchise the Boston Renegades. Curtis was forced to sell the club before the start of the second season. The first coach of the A-League Wildfire was Nigel Boulton, a native of Wales. Boulton resigned following the completion of the first year to take up the State Director of Coaching position in Mississippi. He now coaches the men's program at William Carey University in Hattiesburg, Mississippi. The Wildfire were the official 'farm team' for the New England Revolution of Major League Soccer. Notable former players on the Wildfire/Bulldogs roster include Jon Busch (1997) (who played for the US National Team in 2005) and Steve Nicol, (a legend with Liverpool FC in England, and the Scottish National team) both of whom have also found success in Major League Soccer.

Year-by-year

Coaches
 Nigel Boulton: 1997
 John Kerr: 1998-99
 Steve Nicol: 1999, 2000–01

See also
New England Revolution
Cape Cod Crusaders

References

1996 establishments in Massachusetts
2001 disestablishments in Massachusetts
A-League (1995–2004) teams
Association football clubs established in 1996
Association football clubs disestablished in 2001
Defunct soccer clubs in Massachusetts
Sports in Framingham, Massachusetts
USISL teams